"No Way But the Hard Way" is a song by Australian hard rock band Airbourne and the first single from their album No Guts. No Glory.

Track listing
"No Way But the Hard Way"

Music video
The music video of the song features scenes of the band in the Dinosaur Records building in Los Angeles, smashing and destroying the furniture and playing on the roof. The music video was directed by Sum 41 drummer Steve Jocz.

The video clip was shot in Sydney, Australia on the roof of the Accor Pullman Hotel, Homebush, Sydney Olympic Park, New South Wales State, Australia.

Personnel
Joel O'Keeffe - lead vocals, lead guitar
David Roads - rhythm guitar, backing vocals
Justin Street - bass, backing vocals
Ryan O'Keeffe - drums, percussion

Charts

External links

2010 singles
Airbourne (band) songs
2010 songs
Roadrunner Records singles
EMI Records singles
Song recordings produced by Johnny K